The year 1815 in archaeology involved some significant events.

Explorations

Excavations

Finds
 The Philae obelisk is discovered, bearing inscriptions in hieroglyphic and Greek including the royal names of Ptolemy IX and Cleopatra.
 A fragmentary palimpsest of the Ambrosian Library at Milan (from the 4th century) is discovered by Cardinal Mai, including documents about Roman orator/rhetorician and grammarian Marcus Cornelius Fronto.
 The Candi Sukuh temple is first discovered, in very poor condition, by Johnson, the resident of Surakarta during the period of government under Sir Stamford Raffles.
 Roman bath-house at Vinovia is discovered.

Publications

Other events

Births

Deaths

Archaeology
Archaeology by year
Archaeology
Archaeology